Tourism is the largest economic industry in the Maldives, as it plays an important role in earning foreign exchange revenues and employing 25,000 people in the tertiary sector of the country. The archipelago of the Maldives is the main source of attraction to many tourists visiting the island country.

The tourism industry is especially vulnerable to climate change: as one of the island nations expected to be most impacted by climate change, sea level rise and subsequent increased extreme weather, coastal flooding, and coral bleaching damage the natural attractions that bring many of the tourists to the country.

History 

Tourism in the Maldives began in 1972. A United Nations mission on development which visited the Maldives Islands in the 1960s did not recommend tourism, claiming that the islands were not suitable. Ever since the launch of the first resort in Maldives in 1972, however, tourism in Maldives has flourished. The arrival of the first tourist's group is estimated to have occurred in February 1972. Tourism in Maldives started with just two resorts with a capacity of about 280 beds. Kurumba Island Resort is the first resort opened in Maldives, followed by Bandos Island Resort. At present, there are over 132 resorts located in the different atolls constituting the Republic of Maldives. Over the  decades, the number of tourists in Maldives is rising continuously. In 2009, local island guesthouses started popping up in the Maldives.  This was thanks to a change in regulations that began to officially allow tourists to stay among the local population, rather than just on privately owned resort islands. In 2015, a total of 1.2 million tourists visited the Maldives, and another 1.5 million visited in 2016.

In 2018, the Maldives operated 130 island-resorts. Current work is being undertaken to boost tourism room capacity by constructing another 23 properties, which will include foreign developers such as the Waldorf Astoria, Mövenpick, Pullman and the Hard Rock Café Hotel. Extensive upgrades at the Velana International Airport will allow for 7.5 million visitors by early 2019 or 2020.

Level of tourism development 
Tourism in the Maldives has started in 1972 with only two hotels, now – there are more than 100 operational resorts. The unique condition of Maldives is that one island is one resort, meaning that one hotel occupies the whole island. By doing so, resorts provide more privacy and more luxury for their visitors. The Maldives are also trying to stay eco-friendly and use more of solar energy rather than diesel. The Maldives provide facilities and services, entertainment and telecommunication services, they also provide numerous resorts, hotels, guest houses, and liveboards.

Overview of a typical tropical resort 

A tourist resort in the Maldives typically consists of a hotel on its own island, with its population entirely made up of tourists and work force, with no local people or houses.

Tourism workers and employers 
Workers of  the tourism industry are represented by the Tourism Employees Association of Maldives (TEAM).  TEAM argues the 25,000 workers employed in the industry face poor conditions and have very low  wages (between US$80 to US$235 monthly) given the cost of living.

Arrivals by country 
Most visitors arriving to the Maldives on short term basis, were from the following countries of nationality:

Climate change 

The Maldives' economy is greatly influenced by any climate changes. Tourism sector can be damaged by the increased likelihood of violent storms, damage to coral reefs, and beach erosion, which are now more likely to happen because of the rising seas.

As a consequence of climate change, Maldives is now facing the problem of rising seas and coral reefs bleaching. According to the World Bank, with "future sea levels projected to increase in the range of 10 to 100 centimeters by the year 2100, the entire country could be submerged." New government has made a decision to fight the rising seas problem with geoengineering projects instead of trying to move the population. The idea is to rent out other islands and even build new islands, so the population of those islands who are more in trouble could be relocated. One of those built islands is Hulhumale'.

It has been also pointed out that some islands can grow naturally.

World Bank states that, "Rising sea temperatures also threaten the coral reefs and cause bleaching and death, with the most severe damage in areas that are stressed by pollutants, or damaged by physical disturbance. Vulnerability to climate change hazards has been magnified by damage to coral reefs which has in turn impaired their protective function, thus a negative cycle of impact."

Health concerns
On 24 May 2021, Maldives had the world's fastest-growing COVID-19 outbreak, with the highest number of infections per million people over the prior 7 and 14 days, according to data compiled by Bloomberg. Doctors warned that increasing demand for COVID-19 care could hinder their ability to handle other health emergencies in the Maldives.

Environmental concerns

Ecotourism 

There is some promotion of ecotourism in the Maldives, with resorts emphasizing recycling of heat that is wasted in producing electricity and stricter policies of waste disposal. 

Nevertheless, the Maldives have frequently come under criticism for their lack of protection of the local shark populations, which have sharply decreased after being hunted extensively for decades. In some areas, sharks have entirely disappeared. Sharks are hunted primarily for their fins. Shark fins are exported from the Maldives to other countries in Asia, where they are regarded as a delicacy. The fins are amputated from the live animals, which are then thrown back alive into the sea.

Although this practice is prohibited by law in the Maldives, these laws are not respected or enforced by the local authorities.

In 2001, a local environmental organization called Seamarc/Marine savers (known onsite as Reefscapers), set up an ambitious program of reimplantation of coral in damaged areas, on the basis of resort sponsorship. 

"There are big challenges that come with the advantages of the islands' tourist assets, however," said Richard Damania, World Bank Lead Environmental Economist. "The country's coral reefs, which protect it from storm surges and serve as the main attraction for the tourism-driven economy, are in danger of being damaged or destroyed by poorly handled waste disposal methods."

Natural environment  

Its tourism industry is today the Maldives' largest revenue generator. Due to their underwater scenery and clean water, the Maldives is ranked among the best recreational diving destinations of the world, with over 60 local dive sites across the islands. It was also reported to be the world's most desired honeymoon destination, according to a global survey by Agoda.com.

Safety concerns 
The level of crime in the Maldives is low, but some personal belongings left on the beaches or in the hotels can be stolen. Knife crime in populated areas, like the capital Male, has increased. Tourists should also follow local advice on if there is any danger with swimming. 

Some piracy and armed robbery attacks have also occurred in the area of Gulf of Aden and Horn of Africa. A threat of terrorism is possible; the targets can include: government buildings, schools, places of worship, airports, public places, etc.

On February 5, 2018, the government declared a state of emergency due to the increased protests and aggressive clashes with the police in Malé. Those demonstrations are advised to be avoided.

See also 
 Economy of the Maldives
 Visa policy of Maldives
 Ministry of Tourism (Maldives)

References

External links 

 Current Status of the Maldives Tourism Industry
 Official website of Maldives Marketing and Public Relations Corporation
 Ministry of Tourism
 Tourism Employees Association of Maldives (TEAM)

 
Maldives